List of Scientific institutions of the National Academy of Sciences of Ukraine by departments.

Section of technical physics and mathematical sciences

Department of Mathematics
 NASU Institute of Mathematics
 NASU Institute of Applied Mathematics and Mechanics
 Pidstryhach Institute of Applied Problems in Mechanics and Mathematics
 NASU Center on Informational Problems of Territories
 NASU Center of Mathematical Modeling
 Mytropolsky International Center of Mathematics

Department of Informatics
 NASU Center of Cybernetics
 Hlushkov Institute of Cybernetics
 NASU Institute of Programming Systems
 NASU Institute of Space Research (along with State Space Agency of Ukraine)
 Lviv Center
 Kharkiv Center
 NASU Institute for Information Recording
 Uzhhhorod Science and Technology Center of Information Carrying Optical Materials
 NASU Institute on Problems of Artificial Intelligence (along with Ministry of Education and Science)
 Dobrov Center for Scientific and Technological Potential and Science History Studies

 NASU Educational and Scientific Complex "Institute of Applied Systems Analysis" (along with Kyiv Polytechnic Institute)
 International Science Center of Informational Technologies and Systems (along with Ministry of Education and Science)
 State Research Institute of Informatics and Modeling of Economics (along with Ministry of Economical Development and Trade)

Department of Mechanics
 Polyakov Institute of Mechanical Geoengineering
 Special design bureau
 Tymoshenko Institute of Mechanics
 Research production
 Pysarenko Institute on problems of Strength
 Special design bureau
 Institute of Mechanical Engineering (along with State Space Agency of Ukraine)
 Special design bureau (along with State Space Agency of Ukraine)
 Institute of Hydromechanics
 Institute of Transportation Systems and Technologies
 Institute of Machines and Systems
 Science Engineering Center of Newest Technologies

Department of Physics and Astronomy
 Main Astronomical Observatory
 Crimean Laser Observatory
 Halkin Institute of Physics and Engineering in Donetsk
 Institute of Electronic Physics
 Institute of Ionosphere (along with Ministry of Education and Science)
 Kudryumov Institute of Physics of Metals
 Institute of Magnetism (along with Ministry of Education and Science)
 Institute of applied problems in Physics and Biophysics
 Usykov Institute of Radiophysics and Electronics
 Bogolyubov Institute of Theoretical Physics
 Institute of Physics
 Special design bureau of Physical Instruments with research production
 Institute of Physics in Mining Processes
 Institute of Physics in Condensed Systems
 Science and Telecommunication Center "Ukrainian Academic and Research Network"
 Lashkaryov Institute of Physics in Semiconductors
 Technological park "Semiconducting Technologies and Materials, Optical Electronic and Sensor Technology"
 Special design bureau with research production
 Radioastronomical Institute
 Verkin Institute for Low Temperature Physics and Engineering
 International center "Institute of Applied Optics"
 Science and Technology Center "Reactive-Electron"

Department of Earth Science
 NASU Institute of Geography
 NASU Institute of Geology and Geochemistry of Fossil Fuels
 NASU Institute of Geological Sciences
 Subbotin Institute of Geophysics
 Semenenko Institute of Geochemistry, Mineralogy and Ore Mineralization
 NASU Institute on problems of Environmental Use and Ecology
 NASU Institute of Marine Hydrophysics

Department of Materials Physics and Engineering
 Paton Institute of Electric Welding
 NASU Institute of Pulse Processes and Technologies
 Frantsevych Institute of Materials
 NASU Institute of Monocrystalline
 Bakul Institute of Superhard Materials
 NASU Institute of Scintillation Materials
 NASU Institute of Thermoelectrics (along with Ministry of Education and Science)
 Nekrasov Institute of Ferrous Metallurgy
 Karpenko Institute of Physics and Mechanics
 NASU Institute of Metals and Alloys Physics

Department of Energy Physics and Engineering
 NASU Institute of Renewable Energy
 NASU Institute of Coal producing Energy Technologies
 NASU Institute of Gas
 NASU Institute of Electrodynamics
 NASU Institute of Thermophysics Engineering
 Pukhov Institute on problem of modeling in Energy

Department of Nuclear Physics and Energy
 NASU Institute of Geochemistry of Surrounding Environment (along with State Emergency Service)
 NASU Institute of Nuclear Research
 Kharkiv Institute of Physics and Engineering

Section of Chemical and Biological Sciences

Department of Chemistry
 Ovcharenko Institute of Biocolloidal Chemistry
 NASU Institute of Bioorganic Chemistry and Petrochemistry
 Vernadsky Institute of General and Non-organic Chemistry
 Dumansky Institute of Colloidal Chemistry and Water Chemistry
 NASU Institute of Organic Chemistry
 Lytvynenko Institute of Physical Organic Chemistry and Coal Chemistry
 Pysarzhevsky Institute of Physical Chemistry
 NASU Institute of Sorption and Problems of Endoecology
 NASU Institute of Food Chemistry and Technology
 NASU Institute of Macromolecular Chemistry
 NASU Institute of Surface Chemistry
 Bohatsky Institute of Physics and Chemistry

Department of Biochemistry, Physiology and Molecular Biology
 NASU Institute of Cell Biology
 Palladin Institute of Biochemistry
 Kavetsky Institute of Experimental Pathology, Oncology, and Radiobiology
 Zabolotny Institute of Microbiology and Virology
 NASU Institute of Cryobiology and Cryomedicine Problems
 Bohomolets Institute of Physiology

Department of General Biology
 Kovalevsky Institute of Southern Seas Biology
 Kholodny Institute of Botanic Studies
 NASU Institute of Hydrobiology
 NASU Institute of Carpathian Ecology
 Schmalhausen Institute of Zoology
 NASU Institute of Cell Biology and Genetical Engineering
 NASU Institute of Plant Physiology and Genetics
 NASU Institute of Food Biotechnology and Genomics
 Trostianets State Arboretum
 Oleksandriya National Arboretum
 Sofiyivka National Arboretum
 Danube Biosphere Preserve
 Black Sea Biosphere Preserve
 Karadag Nature Preserve
 Luhansk Nature Preserve
 Ukrainian Steppe Nature Preserve
 Donetsk Botanical Garden
 Kryvyi Rih Botanical Garden
 Hryshko National Botanical Garden
 Feofaniya Park and Garden

Section of Social and Humanitarian Sciences

Department of Economics
 Ptukha Institute of Demographics and Social Research
 NASU Institute of Industrial Economics
 NASU Institute of Economics and Forecasting

Department of History, Philosophy, and Law
 NASU Institute of Archaeology
 Koretsky Institute of State and Law
 NASU Institute of History of Ukraine
 Kuras Institute of Political and Ethnological Research
 NASU Institute of Sociology
 Krymsky Institute of Oriental Studies
 Skovoroda Institute of Philosophy
 Kyiv University of Law
 Vernadsky National Library of Ukraine
 NASU Center of Humanitarian Education

Department of Literature, Language, and Art Studies
 NASU Institute of Encyclopedic Research
 Shevchenko Institute of Literature
 Rylsky Institute of Art Studies, Folkloristics, and Ethnology
 Potebnia Institute of Linguistics
 NASU Institute of Ethnology
 Krypiakevych Institute of Ukrainian Studies
 NASU Institute of Ukrainian Language
 Ukrainian Language Information Foundation

Scientific institutions of the NASU Presidium
 Institute on problems of Mathematical Machines and Systems
 Special Design Bureau of Management Systems with Research Production

Liquidated institutes
 NASU Institute of World Economy and International Relations (academician Yuriy Pakhomov)
 NASU International Center of Molecular Physiology (academician Oleh Kryshtal)

External links
 List of scientific institutions. National Academy of Sciences of Ukraine

National Academy of Sciences of Ukraine
Research institutes in Ukraine